Manhattan Brewing Company may refer to:

Manhattan Brewing Company of Chicago
Manhattan Brewing Company of New York